King of the Jews is a book by Nick Tosches. On the surface it is a biography of Arnold Rothstein, the man who reputedly fixed the 1919 World Series, inspired the characters of Meyer Wolfsheim in The Great Gatsby and Nathan Detroit in Guys and Dolls, and created the modern system of organized crime.

The book also contains numerous digressions away from its main subject, including: an extended linguistic discussion of transformation of the Hebrews from a polytheistic to monotheistic religion, early 20th-century European Jewish culture, acknowledging the lack of real information on the life of Rothstein, several instances of the author breaking from the various narratives to speak in the first person to the reader, and a repeating motif involving Jesus having sex with a woman.

The book began as an article in Vanity Fair, for which Tosches was a contributing editor.

External links
 A Jazz Age Autopsy Tosches' original Vanity Fair article on Arnold Rothstein.

Books by Nick Tosches
2005 non-fiction books
Ecco Press books
Arnold Rothstein